Setaria barbata, with common names bristly foxtail grass, corn grass, Mary grass, and East Indian bristlegrass, is a species of grass in the family Poaceae native to  tropical Africa and tropical Asia.

References

barbata